Andělská Hora, originally called Engelsburg, is a castle above the village of Andělská Hora, about  southeast of Karlovy Vary, in the Karlovy Vary Region of the Czech Republic.

The ruins of the Andělská Hora castle stands upon a rock overlooking the village of Andělská Hora which lies just below. It was founded at the turn of the 14th to the 15th century by Boreš z Rýznburk, a noblemen from the Rýznburk family, as protection for their estates. The castle was destroyed by fire during the Thirty Years' War and abandoned in the 17th century.

See also
 List of castles in the Karlovy Vary Region

References

Castles in the Czech Republic
Castles in the Karlovy Vary Region
Ruined castles in the Czech Republic